Late Night Feelings is the fifth studio album by British producer Mark Ronson. It was released on 21 June 2019. It is his first album in four years, following Uptown Special (2015). Its lead single, "Nothing Breaks Like a Heart" featuring Miley Cyrus, was released on 29 November 2018. The title track "Late Night Feelings", featuring Lykke Li, was released alongside the album pre-order on 12 April. "Don't Leave Me Lonely" was released on 17 May 2019 as the album's third single. "Find U Again" featuring Camila Cabello was released on 30 May 2019 as the fourth single. "Pieces of Us" featuring King Princess was released on 17 June 2019 as the album's fifth single.

Background
In an interview with Las Vegas Weekly, Ronson described the album as "definitely the best thing" he has ever made and the album he has worked the hardest on. He also agreed that the album contains "sad bangers", as those are the kinds of songs that have "emotional resonance" and that he was drawn to making during the writing and recording process.

Critical reception

Late Night Feelings received generally positive reviews upon release. On Metacritic, the album has an average rating of 75/100, which indicates generally positive reviews.

In a positive review, Yasmin Cowan of Clash said that the album, "might be a collection of "sad bangers" but this is a powerful - and empowering - project." Though noting some flaws, Hannah Mylrea of NME called the album "bold, brilliant and genuinely interesting pop music."

Track listing

Notes
  signifies a co-producer
  signifies an additional producer

Personnel

Mark Ronson – bass, drums, guitars, piano, programming, synthesizers
Picard Brothers – programming, synthesizers
Honorable C.N.O.T.E. – programming
Jr Blender – programming
Kevin Parker – background vocals, guitar, programming, synthesizers
P2J – additional production
Tom Elmhirst– additional production, mixing
Brandon Bost – engineering, programming, synthesizers
JAE5 – programming, synthesizer
Jamie xx – additional production
Lykke Li – vocals
Camila Cabello – vocals
King Princess – vocals
YEBBA – vocals
Alicia Keys – vocals
The Last Artful, Dodgr – vocals
Miley Cyrus – vocals
Angel Olsen – guitar, vocals
Diana Gordon – vocals
Ilsey Juber – drums, vocals
Denise Renee – background vocals
Amandla Stenberg – background vocals
Tiff Stevenson – background vocals
Chris Turner – background vocals
Nick Movshon – bass, drums, engineering
Alissia Benveniste – bass
Homer Steinweiss – drums, engineering
Conor Szymanski – drums
Thomas Brenneck – guitars, piano, synthesizer
Joe Crispiano – guitar
Jonah Feingold – guitar
Alex Greenwald – guitar, synthesizer
Victor Axelrod – synthesizer
Ivan Jackson – synthesizer, trumpet
John Carroll Kirby – synthesizer
Greg Phillinganes – synthesizer
Leon Michaels – piano, synthesizer
Daniel Bhattacharya – violin
Charlie Bisharat – violin
Fiona Brice – violin
Chris Clad – violin
Anna Croad – violin
Francis Grimes – violin
Marianne Haynes – violin
Gerardo Hilera – violin
Ian Humphries – violin
Carrie Kennedy – violin
Patrick Kiernan – violin
Natalie Leggett – violin
Kirsty Mangan – violin
Eleanor Mathieson – violin
Perry Montague-Mason – violin
Steve Morris – violin
Charles Mutter – violin
Sara Parkins – violin
Kerenza Peacock – violin
Michele Richards – violin
Jenny Sacha – violin
Neil Samples – violin
Sarah Sexton – violin
Ellie Stamford – violin
Christopher Tombling – violin
Shalini Vijayan – violin
Matthew Ward – violin
Honor Watson – violin
Deborah Widdup – violin
Paul Willey – violin
John Wittenberg – violin
Nick Barr – viola
Reiad Chibah – viola
Tom Lea – viola
Shawn Mann – viola
Bryony Mycroft – viola
Virginia Slater – viola
Dave Walther – viola
Katie Wilkinson – viola
Rodney Wirtz – viola
Katie Burke – cello
Dave Daniels – cello
Rosie Danvers – cello
Katherine Jenkinson – cello
Jo Knight – cello
Jane Oliver – cello
Roger Linley – double bass
Richard Pryce – double bass
Wayne Bergeron – flugelhorn
Laura Brenes – French horn
Dave Guy – trumpet
Chris Elliot – arranger, conductor
David Campbell – conductor
Raymond Mason – conductor
Riccardo Damian – engineering, mixing, programming
Todd Monfalcone – engineering, mixing assistant
Barry McCready – engineering
Dylan Neustadter – engineering
Leo Abrahams – engineering
Nick Taylor – engineering
Phil Joly – engineering
Rob Bisel – engineering
Rowan McIntosh – engineering
Tyler Beans – engineering
Jens Jungkurth – engineering
Abby Echiverri – engineering assistant
Mikayla Mundy – engineering assistant
Matthew Scatchell – engineering assistant
Tommy Vicari – horn and string engineer
Martin Hollis – string engineer
Joshua Blair – string engineer
Serban Ghenea – mixing
John Hanes – mixing assistant
Randy Merrill – mastering

Charts

Certifications

References

2019 albums
Mark Ronson albums
Albums produced by Mark Ronson
Albums produced by Jamie xx
Albums produced by Kevin Parker
RCA Records albums